Samogitians (Samogitian: žemaitē) are an ethnographic group of Lithuanians of the Samogitia region, an ethnographic region of Lithuania. Many speak the Samogitian language, which in Lithuania is mostly considered a dialect of the Lithuanian language together with the Aukštaitian dialect. The Samogitian language differs the most from the standard Lithuanian language.

Even though Samogitians are politically not considered to be an ethnic group, 2,169 people declared their ethnicity as Samogitian during the Lithuanian census of 2011, of whom 53.9% live in Telšiai County. The political recognition and cultural understanding of the Samogitian ethnicity has, however, changed drastically throughout the last few centuries as 448,022 people declared themselves Samogitians, not Lithuanians, in the 1897 Russian Empire census.

History

On 13 July 1260, the Samogitians decisively defeated the joint forces of the Teutonic Knights from Prussia and Livonian Order from Livonia in the Battle of Durbe. Some 150 knights were killed, including Livonian Master Burchard von Hornhausen and Prussian Land Marshal Henrik Botel.

Samogitians lived in western Lithuania and were closely related to Semigallians and Curonians. In 1413, they became the last group of Europeans to convert to Christianity. Samogitians were one of the three main nations of the Grand Duchy of Lithuania, Ruthenia, and Samogitia. In 1857, there were 418,824 people of Samogitian roots and 444,921 persons declared the Samogitian language as their mother tongue in 1897 in Kovno Governorate. Currently Lithuania does not allow for declaration of Samogitian nationality in passports as it is not a recognized ethnicity. In list of ethnic groups of Russia there is one person who declared himself with "Zhemaijty".

Exonyms
Samogitians call themselves žemaitē, although exonyms are used in different languages.

References

External links
Short history of Samogitia
Samogitian self identification during centuries

Ethnic groups in Lithuania
Samogitia